Latisipho timetus is a species of sea snail, a marine gastropod mollusk in the family Buccinidae, the true whelks.

Description
(Original description at  Aulacofusus (Limatofusus) timetus) The small, thin shall has a thin pale olive periostracum. Its length measures 30 mm. It contains five or more whorls. The protoconch is eroded. The suture is distinct and not appressed. There is no axial sculpture. The spiral sculpture consists of (on the penultimate whorl about 33) fine regular sharp striae with wider flat interspaces, for the most part uniform, but near the periphery tending to be wider. This sculpture covers the whole surface. The aperture is wide and semilunate. Its width measures 15 mm. The thin outer lip is gently arcuate. The white inner lip is erased. The columella is straight and attenuated in front. The siphonal  canal is wide, deep, very short and with a well-marked siphonal fasciole.

Distribution
This marine species occurs off Unalaska, Aleutian Islands.

References

 Kosyan A.R. & Kantor Yu.I. (2013). Revision of the genus Aulacofusus Dall, 1918 (Gastropoda: Buccinidae). Ruthenica: The Russian Malacological Journal. 23(1): 1-33.

External links

Buccinidae
Gastropods described in 1919